The 2008 Nordic Golf League was the 10th season of the Nordic Golf League, one of four third-tier tours recognised by the European Tour.

Schedule
The following table lists official events during the 2008 season.

Order of Merit
The Order of Merit was based on prize money won during the season, calculated using a points-based system. The top five players on the tour (not otherwise exempt) earned status to play on the 2009 Challenge Tour.

See also
2008 Danish Golf Tour
2008 Finnish Tour
2008 Swedish Golf Tour

Notes

References

Nordic Golf League